Ipswich Knights Football Club is an Australian soccer club from Ipswich, Queensland. The Ipswich Knights were formed in 1998 and was an amalgamation of two Ipswich clubs, the Bundamba-based "Coalstars" and the Ebbw Vale-based "St Helens United". Ipswich Knights currently play in the Football Queensland Premier League 2.

History
Ipswich Knights was formed in 1998, with the amalgamation of two existing Ipswich clubs, Coalstars (formerly based at Bundamba) and St Helens United (formerly based at Ebbw Vale).

The Coalstars club had been formed in 1964 through the amalgamation of two of the oldest football clubs in the local region, Blackstone Rovers (1888) and Bundamba Rangers (1894). St Helens United was formed in 1966, through the amalgamation of the original St Helens club (1910) with Redbank, who had previously merged with one of the most successful clubs in local football, the Dinmore Bush Rats, originally called New Chum Bush Rats (1891).

These Ipswich clubs had produced many talented players, including Col and Spencer Kitching, Cliff Sander, Al Warren, Duncan McKenna, Graham Kruger, Ross Kelly, Graham Kathage, Les Keith and Stanley McCrea, Chris Brown, Brian Vogler and Ian Johnston, some of whom had represented both Queensland and Australia. However, the rise of wealthy ethnic clubs in Brisbane in the 1950s and 60s lured many of the top players to Brisbane, thus draining these Ipswich clubs.

Current squad
as of 2014

References

External links
Official Website

Soccer clubs in Queensland
Brisbane Premier League teams
Sport in Ipswich, Queensland
Association football clubs established in 1998
1998 establishments in Australia